Bukchon Art Museum is an art museum in Seoul, South Korea. It has 150 pieces of Korean modern art, 200 pieces of Chinese art, 2500 of old documents of Joseon dynasty in total of 2850.

See also
Gahoe Museum
List of museums in Seoul
List of museums in South Korea

External links

Jongno District
Art museums and galleries in Seoul
Art museums established in 2005
2005 establishments in South Korea